Anjuman-i-Himayat-i-Islam ("The Association for the Support of Islam") or Anjuman-e-Himayat-e-Islam is an Islamic intellectual and social welfare organisation with branches both in India and Pakistan. It was founded in Lahore on 24 September 1884 in a mosque known as Masjid Bakan inside Mochi Gate, Lahore, by Khalifa Hameed-ud-Din.

History and background
The Indian Rebellion of 1857 against the British Empire also known as the War of Independence of 1857 was an important and historical milestone in the history of India. Many political and social movements were later inspired by it, including the Aligarh Movement, founded by Sir Syed Ahmad Khan, and the Aligarh Muslim University (founded in 1878). 

Anjuman-i-Himayat-i-Islam was founded in Lahore on 22 September 1884 in a mosque known as Masjid Bakan inside Mochi Gate, Lahore, by Khalifa Qazi Hameed-ud-Din. Association's first President was Abdul Qadir (1872 – 1950) who was a political activist and scholar. 

One of its major efforts was the foundation of a number of schools for Muslim girls and orphanages in the Punjab, where girls were taught Urdu, the Qur'an, mathematics, needlework, and crafts. It started a publishing house for appropriate textbooks for Muslim girls' and boys' schools, and these textbooks were used all over the Punjab and beyond. In 1939, it founded the Islamia College for Women in Lahore, the only one of its kind in the region, whose curriculum was the standard Bachelor of Arts program, supplemented by Islamic education. It also founded Islamia College Lahore in 1892.

The Anjuman-i-Himayat-i-Islam was a body that represented a spontaneous desire on the part of middle-class Muslims of Lahore to cooperate with each other for common good. The Anjuman also played a vital role to provide a political platform for Indian Muslims.

Later, a number of other institutions were initiated in Pakistan under the auspices of or partially supported by the Anjuman. One of such most prominent schools which gained recognition and was later turned into a full-fledged government-run public high school is the Himayat-ul-Islam High School in Hyderabad, Sindh, which has two distinct sections, the Himayat-ul-Islam Boys and Girls High Schools. The school was initiated by a prominent Shaikh Sindhi family in Hyderabad in the 1960s by granting their property with the sole aim of extending English-medium quality education to the masses.

Activities
The association is composed of Muslim intellectuals and politicians seeking to reform Muslim society and work on its development. Some of its most prominent members included the famous poet Sir Muhammad Iqbal, who recited his first poems at the sessions of the Anjuman. Its purpose is the educational uplift of Muslims of the Indian subcontinent.

Publications
 Risala-e-Anjuman-e-Himayat-e-Islam (first published in 1885)

Programs and services
In addition to numerous other charitable services, the Anjuman runs:
 Yateem Khana (an orphanage, established 1884)
 Islamia College (Lahore) (established 1892)

Public schools
 Dar-ul-Shafqat (for males only)
 Dar-ul-Shafqat (for females only)
 Dar-ul-Aman (for females only)
 Dar-ul-Uloom Deenia (for both males and females)
 Hamayat-e-Islam High School (for boys)
 Hamayat-e-Islam Pasha Girls High School
 Hamayat-e-Islam Rajgarh School
 Hamayat-e-Islam Degree College (for women only)
 Hamayat-e-Islam Law College
 Hamayat-e-Islam Tibbya College
 Hamayat-e-Islam Younani Shafa Khana
 Hamayat-e-Islam Library

See also 
Anjuman Talaba-e-Islam

References

External links
official website of Anjuman-e-Himayat-e-Islam of Tamil Nadu, India
125th anniversary event in 2017 of Anjuman-e-Himayat-e-Islam on YouTube

Organisations based in Lahore
Religious organizations established in 1884
1884 establishments in India
Islamic organisations based in Pakistan